A total solar eclipse occurred on July 29, 1878, over much of North America including the region of the Rocky Mountains. A solar eclipse occurs when the Moon passes between Earth and the Sun, thereby totally or partly obscuring the image of the Sun for a viewer on Earth. A total solar eclipse occurs when the Moon's apparent diameter is larger than the Sun's, blocking all direct sunlight, turning day into darkness. Totality occurs in a narrow path across Earth's surface, with the partial solar eclipse visible over a surrounding region thousands of kilometres wide.
This eclipse was visible at sunrise at a path across northeastern Asia and passed across Alaska, western Canada, and the United States from Montana through Texas.  It then tracked across most of Cuba and southwestern Hispaniola before ending.

Newspapers in the United States reported of large migrations from the Midwest towards the path of totality to view the eclipse. Scientists observing from Pikes Peak in Colorado contended with altitude sickness and snowstorms, among other problems.

High-altitude astronomy 
The 1878 eclipse was a turning point in modern astronomy, because it was the first time that many of the world's leading astronomers had the opportunity to make their observations from the higher altitudes provided by the Rocky Mountains. After the 1878 eclipse, astronomers began to build observatories at locations well above sea level, including on the sides and summits of mountains, a scientific trend which extended throughout the twentieth century and into the twenty-first.

Eclipse images

References

 NASA graphic
 Googlemap
 NASA Besselian elements
 Sketch of Solar Corona July 29, 1878

Further reading
 
 Steve Ruskin (2017). America's First Great Eclipse: How Scientists, Tourists, and the Rocky Mountain Eclipse of 1878 Changed Astronomy Forever. Alpine Alchemy Press. .
 Steve Ruskin (2008). "'Among the Favored Mortals of Earth': The Press, State Pride, and the Great Eclipse of 1878." Colorado Heritage 28(3), 22–35.

External links

 See You on the Dark Side of the Moon (Notre Dame Magazine)
 The Eclipse That Made America Great (The Atlantic)

1878 07 29
1878 in science
1878 07 29
July 1878 events